Brihaspati, also known as Guru, is a Hindu deity. In the ancient Vedic scriptures of Hinduism, Brihaspati is a deity associated with fire, and the word also refers to a rishi (sage) who counsels the devas (gods). In some later texts, the word refers to the largest planet of the solar system, Jupiter, and the deity is associated with the planet as a Navagraha.

Sage
Brihaspati appears in the Rigveda (pre-1000 BCE), such as in the dedications to him in the hymn 50 of Book 4; he is described as a sage born from the first great light, the one who drove away darkness, is bright and pure, and carries a special bow whose string is Rta or "cosmic order" (basis of dharma). His knowledge and character is revered, and he is considered Guru (teacher) by all the Devas. In the Vedic literature and other ancient texts, sage Brihaspati is also called by other names such as Bramanaspati, Purohita, Angirasa (son of Angiras) and Vyasa; he is sometimes identified with god Agni (fire). His wife is Tara (or goddess who personifies the stars in the sky).

The reverence for sage Brihaspati endured through the medieval period, and one of the many Dharmasastras was named after him. While the manuscripts of Brihaspati Smriti have not survived into the modern era, its verses were cited in other Indian texts. Scholars have made an effort to extract these cited verses, thus creating a modern reconstruction of Bṛhaspatismriti. Jolly and Aiyangar have gathered some 2,400 verses of the lost Bṛhaspatismṛti text in this manner. Brihaspati Smriti was likely a larger and more comprehensive text than Manusmriti, and the available evidence suggests that the discussion of the judicial process and jurisprudence in Brihaspati Smriti was often cited.

Brihaspati sutras
Brihaspati sutras, also called the Barhaspatya sutras, is an ancient Sanskrit text named after its author Brihaspati, known for its theories of materialism and anti-theism. Its tenets are at the foundation of the Charvaka school of non-orthodox Indian philosophy. The Brihaspati Sutras manuscript has been lost to history or yet to be found. However, the text is quoted in other Hindu, Buddhist and Jain texts, and this secondary literature has been the source for reconstructing the Brihaspati sutras partially.

Some scholars suggest that Brihaspati sutras are named after Brihaspati in the Vedas, but other scholars dispute this theory because the text rejects the Vedas.

Planet

Brihaspati as a planet (Jupiter) appears in various Hindu astronomical texts in Sanskrit, such as the 5th century Aryabhatiya by Aryabhata, the 6th century Romaka by Latadeva and Panca Siddhantika by Varahamihira, the 7th century Khandakhadyaka by Brahmagupta and the 8th century Sisyadhivrddida by Lalla. These texts present Brihaspati as one of the planets and estimate the characteristics of the respective planetary motion. Other texts such as Surya Siddhanta dated to have been complete sometime between the 5th century and 10th century present their chapters on various planets with deity mythologies.

The manuscripts of these texts exist in slightly different versions, present Brihaspati's motion in the skies, but vary in their data, suggesting that the text were open and revised over their lives. The texts slightly disagree in their data, in their measurements of Brihaspati's revolutions, apogee, epicycles, nodal longitudes, orbital inclination, and other parameters. For example, both Khandakhadyaka and Surya Siddhanta of Varaha state that Brihaspati completes 364,220 revolutions every 4,320,000 earth years, an Epicycle of Apsis as 32 degrees, and had an apogee (aphelia) of 160 degrees in 499 CE; while another manuscript of Surya Siddhanta accepts the revolutions to be 364,220, but revises the apogee to 171 degrees and 16 seconds and the Epicycle slightly.

The 1st millennium CE Hindu scholars had estimated the time it took for sidereal revolutions of each planet including Brihaspati, from their astronomical studies, with slightly different results:

In medieval mythologies particularly those associated with Hindu astrology, Brihaspati has a second meaning and refers to Jupiter. It became the root of the word 'Brihaspativara' or Thursday in the Hindu calendar. Brihaspati as Jupiter is part of the Navagraha in Hindu zodiac system, considered auspicious and benevolent. The word "Thursday" in the Greco-Roman and other Indo-European calendars is also dedicated to planet Jupiter (god of sky and thunder). Their zodiac signs being nearly identical.

Worship

Jyotisha is Hindu astrology, which entails concept of Nakshatra (see also List of Natchathara temples), Navagraha (see also List of Navagraha temples and Saptarishi included in the list of Hindu deities whose dedicated temples are found at various Hindu pilgrimage sites to which Hindus take pilgrimage yatra. One of the most famous temples of Brihaspati is situated in Tanjore district of Tamil Nadu State.

Iconography
The icon of Brihaspati makes his body golden, with his legs striped blue and his head covered with a halo of moon and stars. He holds different items depending on the region. In parts of South Asia he holds a container containing soma, sometimes with a tamed tiger. Elsewhere, his icon carries a stick, a lotus and beads. Brihaspati was married to Tara. In some medieval mythologies, Tara was abducted by Chandra. Tara bore a son, Budha (planet Mercury).

Dedicated day
Thursday is considered to be the dedicated day for Brihaspati. According Hindu mythology, praying to Brihaspati on Thursday provides astrological benefits.

See also
Dyaus Pita
 Navagraha
 Nakshatra
 Jyotisha
Jupiter
Zeus

References

Bibliography

External links

Navagraha
Hindu sages
Rigvedic deities
Hindu gods
Knowledge gods
Jovian deities